The Olowu of Owu is the paramount Yoruba king of Owu kingdom. The first Olowu of Owu (son of Oduduwa's daughter) is also one of the original kings in Yorubaland.

The Owu Kingdom is ruled by princes selected from six ruling houses: Amororo, Otileta, Ayoloye, Akinjobi, Akinoso and Lagbedu. The king is assisted by appointed chiefs known as "Ogboni"s and Ologuns. The Balogun heads the chiefs and has under him Otun, Osi, Seriki, Aare Ago and Jagunna. Ogboni chiefs consists of the Akogun, Obamaja, Orunto, Oyega, Osupori and Omolasin. Olosi is the Ifa priest of the Olowu. Originally, the Owu Kingdom had 3 townships namely Owu, Erunmu and Apomu. By tradition, the Olowu is selected by six kingmakers but two more chieftaincies were added to this number in 1964, those of the Balogun and the Olosi.

Ogboni tradition was not originally part of the people of Owu's culture. It was borrowed from the Egbas after the Owus settled in Abeokuta. Hence, the reason the Owus do not have "Iledi" (Ile Ogboni), the traditional house of the Ogbonis.

In 2006, under the kingship of Oba of Owu, Oba Olusanya Adegboyega Dosunmu (Amororo II), the Owu palace administrative process was reorganized. The Ogboni and Ologun system of chiefs were revamped, and a new Olowu-in-Council emerged. It consists of a Cabinet of seven chiefs, including:

The Balogun: Prime Minister of the Kingdom. 
The Olori Igbimo: Senior Counsel to the Olowu (or king), and overseer of towns and villages where the traditional interests of Olowu exist.
The Olori Omoba: Chief Prince.
The Olori Parakoyi: Head of Commerce and Industry. 
The Balogun Apomu: The commander of the warriors of Apomu
The Oluroko, Oba of Erunmu, (or, where there is no incumbent, a clan chief or elder (Ogboni) from any of the 17 other clans/families in Owu Erunmu: The representative of Erunmu. 
The Iyalode: The chief of the women.

Past and Present Olowu of Owu Kingdom (Owu Kings)

Oba Pawu 1855-1867 (OTILETA Family)
Oba Adefowote 1867-1872 (OTILETA Family)
Oba Aderinmoye 1873-1890 (OTILETA Family)
Oba Adepegba 1893-1905 (AYOLOYE Family)
Oba Owokokade 1906-1918 (OTILETA Family)
Oba Dosunmu 1918-1924 (AMORORO Family)
Oba Adesina 1924-1936 (OTILETA Family)
Oba Adelani Gbogboade 1938-1946 (OTILETA Family)
Oba Salami Gbadela Ajibola 1949-1972 (AYOLOYE Family)
Oba Adebowale Oyegbade 1975-1980 (AKINJOBI Family)
OBA Michael Oyelekan April 29th, 1987 -May 8th, 1987 (AKINOSO Family)
Oba Olawale Adisa Odeleye 1993-2003 (LAGBEDU Family)
Oba Adegboyega Dosunmu Amororo II From 2005 (AMORORO Family) (Deceased)
Oba Prof. Saka Adelola Matemilola Oluyalo Otileta VII from 2022 - till date (OTILETA Family)

References

Origin
Royal

Yoruba royal titles
Nigerian royalty